Deutz-Fahr is a German agricultural machinery manufacturer. It was established in 1968 after the acquisition of the majority of share capital in FAHR, a leading company already producing agricultural equipment in the previous century, by the Klöckner-Humboldt-Deutz AG (KHD) group. In 1995 Deutz-Fahr joined the Italian Group SAME/Lamborghini/Hürlimann to become the SAME Deutz-Fahr Group, now the SDF Group.

The history of Fahr 
Maschinenfabrik Fahr (Fahr Machine Factory) was established by Johann Georg Fahr in Gottmadingen in 1870. One of its most important products was the self-binder, manufactured in 1911, while the first tractor, the Fahr F22, was built in 1938 from an idea of Wilfred Fahr and Bernhard Flerlage, and had a  Deutz F2M414 twin-cylinder diesel engine.

The first design was developed to become the Fahr T22 in 1940, and the Fahr Holzgasschlepper HG25 in 1942. After the end of World War II, the company had to adapt to meet new needs, expanding its product range. Models included the Fahr D30 W (1949), the Fahr D15(1949), the Fahr D12N (1953), the Fahr D17N (1953), the Fahr D90 (1954) and the Fahr D180H(1954). In 1961, KHD acquired 25% of the shares in Fahr, and the complete acquisition of plants and business operations was completed in 1977.

Models produced
Machines and equipment for land farming: forage choppers, threshers, grain mills, mills, presses and hoists (1870)
Forage harvesters: mowers, tedders, rakes (1896)
Harvesters for cereals, reapers, self-binders and combine harvesters (1909)
Hay and straw harvesters: presses, rotary presses, balers, straw choppers, maize choppers, self-loading trailers (1952)
Machines for transport, fertilisation and tilling (1954)

Fahr Tractors

F22 (1938)
T22 (1940)
HG25 (1942)
D28U (1948)
D30W – D22 – D15 (1949)
D15H (1950)
D30L – D25H – D22P – D22PH (1951)
D55L – D12 – D60L – D45L – D12H (1952)
D25N – D25NH – D12N – D12NH – D17N – D17NH (1953)
D17NA – D17NHA – D90 – D270B – D160 – D160H – D180H – D90H – D270H – D270
D130 – D130H (1954)
GT130 – D181 – D400A – D400B – (1955)
D88 –D66 – D165H (1956)
D130A – D130AH (1957)
D135 – D135H – D177 (1958)
D133N – D177S – D460 – D131W – D131L – D133T (1959)
D88E – D132W – D132L (1960)

In the past 1970's, in Argentina, La Cantábrica launch the FX series of Fahr. Three models compound the line-up: FX 80, FX 100 and FX 120.

The history of Deutz 

In 1864 Nicolaus August Otto and Eugen Langen founded N. A. Otto & Cie. in Cologne, the first engine factory in the world, which became Klöckner-Humboldt-Deutz AG in 1938.

In 1867 the "atmospheric gas engine" developed by N.A. Otto and E. Langen won a gold medal at the Exposition Universelle (1867), for the most economical powered machine for light industry.

In 1872 the factory was expanded and the joint-stock company Gasmotoren-Fabrik Deutz AG (GFD) was founded.

In 1876 Nicolaus August Otto completed the "four stroke" internal combustion engine, for all types of fuel; the use of engines began to spread worldwide, starting from Cologne.

In 1884 Otto developed ignition with a low voltage magnet. This electrical ignition system was acquired by Robert Bosch for his business.

In 1894 production of self-propelled machines with Otto engines and tractors got underway in Philadelphia (USA).

In 1907 the mass production of diesel engines began at GFD.

From 1907–1912, under the management of the Italian-born Ettore Bugatti, some car models were built in Cologne.

In 1914 the Company celebrated its 50th anniversary. Up to this date, engines had been produced for an overall hp of 90,000. 3,400 manual workers and 700 office staff were employed at the company.

In 1921 a consortium was founded with Motorenfabrik Oberursel AG and the company name was changed to Deutz AG.

In 1927 Deutz built its first road tractor with a compressor-less diesel engine, in Cologne, the 14 hp Deutz MTH 222 with two forward gears and one reverse gear.

In 1930 Motorenfabrik Deutz AG merged with Maschinenbauanstalt Humboldt AG, founded in 1856, and Motorenfabrik Oberursel AF, founded in 1892, merged with Humboldt-Deutz Motoren AG.

As from 1934, the Deutz F2M 315 was produced.  In 1935 the Deutz F3M 317 came into being, followed in 1936 by the "people's tractor", the F1M414, with single-cylinder, water-cooled, 11 hp engine – the first mini-tractor worldwide to be mass-produced. The tractor was decisive in promoting the mechanisation of small farms. The F1M 414 was built up until 1951. The tractor was then manufactured with an air-cooled engine up until 1959.

In 1936 the lorry manufacturer Fahrzeugfabrik C.D. Magirus AG of Ulm was acquired.

In 1937/1938 Klöckner was acquired and the company was renamed KHD: Klöckner – Humboldt – DEUTZ AG, one of Germany's largest groups, covering all sectors of the engine industry: cars, lorries, trains, ships, aircraft and tractors.

The considerable damage of the war caused production to stop during the winter of 1944–1945. At the end of the war, 74% of the Cologne production sites had been destroyed.

In 1945 reconstruction started with a massive effort.

In 1950, five years after the end of the war, the situation and production had returned to normal conditions. Workforce: 13,000 employees; production: 40,000 engines for an overall hp of 1.5 million; 10,000 tractors, 6,000 industrial vehicles; turnover: 300 million Deutschmarks. This was the era of air-cooled engines. The first was the 15 hp F1L 514. In this period, Deutz also introduced direct power take off with dual friction. Thanks to the D 25 (1958), D 40 (1958) and D 15 (1959) with new generation engines and the FL 712 with front suspensions to improve driving comfort, Deutz recorded a huge sales success.

In 1952, the Argentinian make SIADA, made under licence the firsts Deutz tractors near the city of Cañuelas, Buenos aires province. Five models (three air-cooled and two water-cooled) like the Deutz F1L514, Deutz F2L514, Deutz F3L514, Deutz F3M417 and the Deutz F2M417.

In 1953 production of crawlers started.

In 1958 the D series of tractors was introduced, with the D 40 model garnering the most success. In 1962 machines began to be equipped with the “Deutz-Transfermatic-System”. Shortly before the end of the series, the first six-cylinder Deutz was launched in 1964. The D 80 had a 75 hp.

In 1959, an agreement was signed in Argentina with La Cantábrica for the production of tractors and agricultural implements in the city of Haedo, Buenos Aires. The first models are the: Deutz D-35, Deutz D 30, Deutz D-55 and the local A series like the Deutz A 110, Deutz A 70 – 26, Deutz A 70, Deutz A 50, Deutz A 45, Deutz A-40 / A-40 P, Deutz A 35, Deutz A 30 and the Deutz A 55.

In 1964 the Magirus logo became the symbol of the company KHD.

The D05 tractor range was then built (1965) with four-wheel drive, as well as the D06 series (1968) with over 380,000 models sold.

Deutz-Fahr was established in 1968, following the acquisition of the majority of share capital in FAHR (Gottmadingen), a leading company and part of the Klöckner-Humboldt-Deutz AG (KHD) group, already producing agricultural equipment in the previous century.

In 1969 Ködel&Böhm of Lauingen (Baviera), specialised in the production of agricultural machinery, was acquired.

Also, in 1970 in Argentina, was launched the following models: A 46 S-V / A 65 – A 65 "cañero" / A 85 / A 100 / A 130 / A 144

In 1972 the INTRAC series of multi-role tractors was unveiled, with multiple automatic hitches for implements, a forward cab layout and a front lift and PTO, making them extremely effective in agricultural, civil and industrial applications alike.

In 1978 the DEUTZ-DX was launched on the market: a new generation tractor, featuring synchronised gears, a forced lubrication system, four-wheel drive as standard, electronic hitch regulation and cabs with elastic suspensions, with a horsepower from 80 to 200.

In 1980, launched in Argentina the first Deutz-Fahr tractor line, with the following models: AX 80-S – AX 80-C, AX 100-S, AX 110 L, AX 120-S – AX 120 and AX 160-S / 160-F

Since 1982 all tractors have had the DEUTZ-FAHR brand.

In 1987, Deutz Argentina S.A. launch the following models in Argentina: AX 4.60 / AX 4.60 Viñatero; AX 4.60 y AX 4.75 Super Despeje; AX 4.75; AX 4.100 / AX 4.100L;  AX 4.120; AX 4.125 ST / DT; AX 4.140; AX 4.160; AX 4.170 and AX 4.190.

In 1992 Deutz-Fahr manufactured its one-millionth tractor.

In 1993, with the AGROSTAR 6.71, 6.81 and 8.31, 165 – 230 hp models, ELECTRONIC POWERSHIFT transmissions produced by the SAME+LAMBORGHINI+HÜRLIMANN (SLH) group were used.

In 1995 KHD Agrartechnik GmbH of Cologne (tractors) and Deutz-Fahr Erntesysteme GmbH of Lauingen (combine harvesters, balers) were sold to the Italian Group SLH and the SAME DEUTZ-FAHR GROUP came into being.

In 1997 Klöckner-Humboldt-Deutz AG changed its company name to Deutz AG. The new company focused on the development, production, distribution and after-sales service of 4 – 7,400 kW engines.

Models Produced 
 MTH series (1927)
 MTZ series (1929)
 FM  series (1934)
 FL 514 series (1950)
 FL 612 series (1952)
 FL 712 series (1958)
 D series (1957)
 05 series (1965)
 06 series (1968)
 INTRAC series (1972)
 07 series (1980)
 07 C series (1981)
 DX series (1978)
 DX 3 series (1984)
 DX 4-8 series (1983)
 AGROPRIMA series (1991)
 AGROXTRA series (1990) 4.5
0
 AGROSTAR series (1990)
 AGROTRON series (1995)
 AGROKID series (1996)
 AGROPLUS series (1997)
 AGROTRON MK2 series (1997)
 AGROCOMPACT series (1998)
 AGROSUN series (1998)
 AGROLUX series (2000)
 AGROTRON MK2 series (2000)
 AGROTRON TTV series (2003)
 AGROTRON K series (2005)
 AGROFARM series (2007)

Today's range 

 3 Series
 5D Series
 5D Series Ecoline
 5D Series TTV
 5G Series
 5C Series
 5 Series
 5 Series TTV
 6 Series
 6 Series TTV
 7 Series TTV
 8 Series TTV
 9 Series
 Agroplus
 Agroplus Ecoline
 Agrolux 65|75
 Agrolux 310|320|410
 Agrofarm G 410|430
 Agrofarm T Ecoline
 Agrofarm T-TB
 Agrokid
 Agroplus F-V-S
 Agroplus F Ecoline
 Agroclimber
 Agroclimber F-V
 Telescopic – Agrovector
 Front loaders
 Combine harvesters C9000 Series; C7000 Series; 6040 Series; 60 Series
 Precision Farming: Agrosky; iMonitor

See also 
 Tractor
 Combine harvester
 SDF Group
 SAME (tractors)
 Lamborghini Trattori
 Hürlimann

References

External links 

 www.deutz-fahr.com

SAME Deutz-Fahr
Agricultural machinery manufacturers of Germany
Tractor manufacturers of Germany
Manufacturing companies established in 1864
German companies established in 1864
Companies based in Bavaria